

Regular season
Kelli Blankenship was in her junior season and appeared in all 40 games. She scored six goals and 10 assists for 16 points and had three multiple-point games in the season. Her first two points of the season were earned in an 8-2 win over Ohio State on October 18. She set up Gigi Marvin’s game-winning goal over St. Cloud State on October 31. She tied a career-best with three points in one game in a victory over Bemidji State on November 15. On November 28, she scored the game-winning goal in the 3-1 win over Harvard. In a 12-1 win over Ohio State (on January 10), she tied a career-high with two goals, including her first short-handed goal of her career.
Rachel Drazan was in her senior season and played in 34 games, missing six to an injury. She ranked tenth on the team in scoring and third by defensemen (five goals and 16 assists for 21 points). She had a plus/minus rating of +22. On October 10, she set up Gigi Marvin’s power-play goal against Minnesota Duluth. The following week, she scored her first goal of the season and multiple-point game of the season in an 8-2 win over Ohio State on October 18. On January 31, she established a career-high in assists (3) and points (4) in a game in the 7-4 win over MSU Mankato.
Melanie Gagnon was in her senior season and she was the senior co-captain with Gigi Marvin. Gagnon would finish her Golden Gophers career with 81 career points. Her 81 career points ranks fourth in school history by a defenseman. During the season, she led all blueliners in points with 29 (4 goals, 25 assists). Her plus/minus rating was +33. In addition, she was a member of the Gopher power play and penalty kill units. On the power play, she accumulated 12 points. All four of her goals came during the power play. She scored a game-winning, overtime goal against Minnesota Duluth on October 10. Gagnon ranked second in the WCHA and ninth nationally in points by a defenseman, averaging 0.72 points per game.
In an October 17 victory over Ohio State, she tallied two assists in the 8-1 win. She also notched two assists on November 21 against Minnesota State. On February 7, she scored a power-play goal against Wisconsin in a 4-2 win.  She competed at the NCAA Skills Challenge with fellow Gopher men's senior Justin Bostrom.

Jenny Lura was in her sophomore season and played in 20 games while starting in 17. Her goals against average was 1.62, ranking fourth nationally, and against conference teams, her GAA was 1.64, ranking fourth in the WCHA. In nine games, Lura kept her opponents to zero or one goal. On January 11, she earned her first shutout of the season. Her only loss of the season came on October 26, in a 2-1 defeat to Wisconsin. During the season, Lura held an eight-game win streak and unbeaten in her last 12 games.
Gigi Marvin was in her senior season and finished her career with 195 points in 152 games, ranking sixth in school history in points, goals (87) and assists (108). She was the senior co-captain with Melanie Gagnon and played in 38 games, missing two due to an injury. Marvin ranked third on the team in scoring with 57 points and led the team with 21 power-play points, while ranking third on the team with 27 assists. In the Conference, she tied for fourth in the conference in goals scored (20) and eighth in points scored (34), while ranking 10th nationally in goals per game (0.79).
Marvin tallied three points in the 4-3 overtime win over Minnesota Duluth (October 10). She netted three goals in the series sweep over St. Cloud State to earn her first WCHA Offensive Player of the Week Honors. Her second conference honor was received when she scored four goals en route to a sweep over North Dakota (December 5–6). In a 5-2 win over North Dakota, she recorded her first career hat trick. The first series of the second half of the season was notable for Marvin. She had a career-high six points in one game while accumulating eight total points in the series sweep over Niagara (January 3–4). On January 9, she had three points in a 9-2 win over. She scored a goal and three assists in the 9-1 win over Minnesota State on January 30. In the series sweep over North Dakota from February 13–14, she had a goal and two assists in the series sweep over North Dakota. In the St. Cloud State Series, which was played from February 20–21, she added three goals and an assist. It was in the St. Cloud State Series that the Gophers clinched the WCHA regular season championship.
As a freshman in 2008-09, Jocelyne Lamoureux she finished second on the team and fourth in the nation with 65 points (28 goals, 37 assists). The Gophers appeared in the NCAA Women's Frozen Four. At season’s end, she was earned All-WCHA First Team and All-WCHA Rookie Team honors.
In 2008-09, Monique Lamoureux was a freshman for the Gophers but was the team’s third leading goal scorer, and a second team All-America selection. By mid-February 2009, Monique was leading the nation with 64 points on 32 assists and 32 goals. By season’ end, she ranked third in the NCAA and first among rookies with 75 points in 40 games (39 goals, 36 assists). She ranked second in the nation with five shorthanded goals and tied for third with eight game-winners. She participated in her first Frozen Four that season. In addition, she was the WCHA scoring champion, and WCHA Rookie of the Year. She was the only freshman to be named a top-10 finalist for Patty Kazmaier Memorial Award.
Dagney Willey was in her senior season and appeared in 33 games. Although she had a goal and 10 assists on the season, she had a plus/minus season of +33. She tied a career-high with two assists in the January 10 win against Ohio State. On January 17, against Bemidji State, she added another two-assists.

Playoffs
February 27: Dagney Willey logged the second assist in the game-winning goal against Bemidji State in the first round of the WCHA playoffs.
During the WCHA FINAL FACEOFF, Rachel Drazan tallied a power-play assist in the 7-2 win over Minnesota State. In the win, Kelli Blankenship added an assist.
March 8, Willey netted her first goal since her sophomore year, in the WCHA championship game against Wisconsin.
March 14: Gigi Marvin scored two of the Gophers’ four goals in the NCAA quarterfinal win over Boston College. She scored just 46 seconds into the BC contest and followed with another goal at 3:15 to give Minnesota a quick two-goal lead. Drazan scored an unassisted goal in the 4-3 win over Boston College during the NCAA quarterfinal game. Melanie Gagnon tallied two assists, including one on the power play, in the game.
Marvin was part of all four of the Gophers' goals in the loss against Mercyhurst in the NCAA Frozen Four. Against Mercyhurst, Drazan set up two goals in the NCAA semifinal game to close out her college career.
In the postseason, Jenny Lura stopped 22 of 23 St. Cloud State shots in a 3-1 win to clinch the WCHA regular season championship and saw action in the NCAA semifinal game against Mercyhurst.

Awards and honors
 Kelli Blankenship, All-WCHA Academic Team member
Rachel Drazan, All-WCHA Academic Team member
Rachel Drazan, Second-Team All-WCHA
Rachel Drazan, Hockey Humanitarian Award nominee
 Melanie Gagnon, WCHA Defensive Player of the Year
 Melanie Gagnon, Second-Team All-American
 Melanie Gagnon, All-WCHA First Team selection
 Melanie Gagnon, All-WCHA Academic Team member
 Melanie Gagnon, WCHA All-Tournament Team selection
 Melanie Gagnon, Patty Kazmaier nominee
 Jocelyne Lamoureux, All-WCHA First Team, 2009
 Jocelyne Lamoureux, WCHA All-Rookie Team, 2009
 Monique Lamoureux, All-WCHA First Team, 2009
 Monique Lamoureux, Patty Kazmaier Award, Top 10 Finalist
 Monique Lamoureux, Second Team All-America selection
 Monique Lamoureux, WCHA All-Rookie Team
 Monique Lamoureux, WCHA Rookie of the Year selection
 Monique Lamoureux, WCHA scoring champion
 Jenny Lura, US College Hockey Online Defensive Player of the Week, (Week of January 12)
Gigi Marvin, All-WCHA Academic Team honoree
Gigi Marvin, All-WCHA Second-Team
Gigi Marvin, Patty Kazmaier Award top-10 finalist
Gigi Marvin, WCHA Outstanding Student-Athlete of the Year, Minnesota’s first honor since 2000
Gigi Marvin, WCHA Scholar Athlete
Gigi Marvin, Team's most valuable player
Anne Schleper, WCHA All-Rookie Team
Dagney Willey, Earned the team's Ridder Award for the third time of her career (given to the team's student-athlete that does the most within the community)
Dagney Willey, All-WCHA Academic Team honoree

References

External links
Official site

Minnesota
Minnesota Golden Gophers women's ice hockey seasons
NCAA women's ice hockey Frozen Four seasons
Minn
Minne
Minne